Sheinbaum is a surname. Notable people with the surname include:

Claudia Sheinbaum (born 1962), Mexican scientist, politician, and Mayor of Mexico City
Stanley Sheinbaum (1920–2016), American peace and human rights activist
Louis P. Sheinbaum, American lawyer